Ahmadabad (also Romanized as Aḩmadābād; also known as Aḩmadābād-e Chashmeh and Ahmadī) is a village in Jeyhun Dasht Rural District, Shara District, Hamadan County, Hamadan Province, Iran. At the 2006 census, its population was 786, in 176 families.

References 

Populated places in Hamadan County